, a portmanteau of situational and relationship
"Situationship", a single by Snoh Aalegra